Donnchadh Ó Corráin (28 February 1942 – 25 October 2017) was an Irish historian and Professor Emeritus of Medieval History at University College Cork. He earned his BA in history and Irish from that institution, graduating in 1964.

He was an early Irish and mediaeval historian and published on the Viking Wars, Ireland in the pre-Hiberno-Norman period and the origin of Irish language names. In addition to his position at UCC, he held academic positions at University College Dublin, Dublin Institute for Advanced Studies, Cambridge University, University of Pennsylvania, University of Oslo and Oxford University, where he was a Visiting Senior Research Fellow of Balliol College.

He founded and directed the ArCH, CELT and MultiText projects of U.C.C. He was elected a member of the Royal Irish Academy in 1982.  Shortly before his death his magnum opus, the monumental Clavis Litterarum Hibernensium (3 Vols) (A Key to the Writings of the Irish), was published.

Selected works 
 Ó Corráin, Donnchadh. "Ireland before the Normans". Vol. 2. Gill and Mac Millan, 1972.
 Mac Curtain, Margaret, and Donnchadh Ó Corráin. "Women in Irish society: The historical dimension". No. 11. Westport, Conn.: Greenwood Press, 1979.
 
 Ó Corráin, Donnchadh. "Ireland c. 800: aspects of society." A new history of Ireland - Volume 1" (2005): 549–608.
 
 Ó Corráin, Donnchadh. "The Irish Church, its Reform and the English Invasion". (2017)
 Ó Corráin, Donnchadh. Clavis Litterarum Hibernensium (3 Vols), Brepols. (2017)

References

External links
 institutional homepage
 Extensive list of published articles, CELT
  Ireland after Donnchadh...History Ireland Volume 26

1942 births
2017 deaths
20th-century Irish historians
21st-century Irish historians
Academics of University College Cork
Academics of University College Dublin
Academics of the University of Oxford
Academics of the University of Cambridge
Celtic studies scholars
Irish art historians
People from County Cork
University of Pennsylvania faculty
Academic staff of the University of Oslo
Academics of the Dublin Institute for Advanced Studies